Mel Foster and the Demon Butler is a 2015 gothic children's novel by Julia Golding. Golding also writes under the pen names of Joss Stirling and Eve Edwards. Mel Foster and the Demon Butler has been published by Egmont Publishing in August 2015. The publishing deal was announced in January 2015. The novel is the first book in an adventure series. The next book, Mel Foster and the Time Machine, was published in April 2016.

Plot 

Mel Foster is an orphan, growing up in Victorian England, when he is sent away from the orphanage to work on a ship called The Albatross. When The Albatross gets stuck in ice, Mel accidentally discovers the body of a giantess frozen within the ice. Mr Wallace, a scientist travelling on the ship, convinces Captain Mariner to bring the "monster" back to England, to show Queen Victoria, who will surely pay handsomely to see the monster.

Mel, left to look after the frozen specimen accidentally revives the giantess back to life. However, Eve Frankenstein is not actually a monster. Luckily, she does not want to eat Mel―she wants to protect him.

While Eve and Mel become firm friends in the Arctic, back in England there is definitely something fishy going on in Buckingham Palace. The Queen's creepy butler has a peculiar influence over his monarch. It turns out that this butler is hatching a plan that could destroy the British Empire. It is up to Mel, Evie and an assorted bunch of monsters to save the Empire!

The Setting 

Mel Foster and the Demon Butler starts off in the Arctic during Queen Victoria's reign. Most of the novel is set in London, England.

The characters

Main characters 

 Mel Foster: Mel is the main character in the book. He is an orphan with a mystery surrounding his parentage. 
 Eve Frankestein: Eve is the daughter of Frankenstein's Monster

Secondary characters 
 Doctor Foster: The man who delivered Mel Foster to the orphanage after he was born
 Viorica: Viorica is Lady Viorica Dracula, Count Dracula's little sister and part of the Monster Resistance
 Abel and Cain Jekyll: The twin sons of Dr Jekyll (or should that be Hyde?), they are the leaders of the Monster Resistance

Publishing Details 

 Author: Julia Golding
 First published: August 2015
 
 Publisher: Egmont Publishing
 Age range: 9+ years
 Genre: Children's Fantasy Adventure Series

References

External links

Mel Foster and the Demon Butler at Amazon
The Mel Foster series at the author's website
"Egmont acquires Julia Golding title", The Bookseller, January 9, 2015
"Something monstrous this way comes!" at Girls Heart Books website

2015 British novels
British children's novels
Children's historical novels
British Gothic novels
Novels about orphans
Novels set in London
Novels by Julia Golding
2015 children's books
Egmont Books books